The 2023 FIG World Cup circuit in Artistic Gymnastics is a series of competitions officially organized and promoted by the International Gymnastics Federation (FIG) in 2023.

Schedule

World Cup series

World Challenge Cup series

Medalists

Men

World Cup series

World Challenge Cup series

Women

World Cup series

World Challenge Cup series

Medal table

See also
 2023 FIG Rhythmic Gymnastics World Cup series

References

FIG Artistic Gymnastics World Cup Series, 2023
Artistic Gymnastics World Cup
Artistic